The Journal of Osteopathy was a monthly medical journal that was first published in May 1894 in Kirksville, Missouri by the American School of Osteopathy. It was the first regular publication about the field of osteopathy. Andrew Taylor Still was one of the key contributors to the journal. Its first editor-in-chief was Jenette H. Bolles. It was published until 1964.

References

External links
 Journal of Osteopathy, February 1898

Osteopathy
Alternative and traditional medicine journals
1894 establishments in Missouri
Publications disestablished in 1964
Publications established in 1894
English-language journals
Monthly journals